Elfriede Pirkmann is an Austrian luger who competed during the 1970s and early 1980s. A natural track luger, she won six medals in the women's singles event at the FIL European Luge Natural Track Championships with two golds (1973, 1978), two silvers (1974, 1977), and two bronzes (1975, 1981).

References
Natural track European Championships results 1970-2006.

Austrian female lugers
Year of birth missing (living people)
Living people
20th-century Austrian women